Robert E. “Bob” Willen from Shoreham, New York is a former U.S. soccer goalkeeper who was the 1987 ISAA Goalkeeper of the Year.  He is currently a partner at A.T. Kearney and managing director for the Middle East based in Dubai. He also leads the Government and Economic Development Practice. Previously, he had responsibility for A.T. Kearney's global Automotive; Aerospace & Defense; Transportation and Industrials practice areas; and the United States public sector practice.

Early life and soccer career  

Willen graduated from Shoreham-Wading River High School where he set a New York High School record for 39 career shutouts.  He played collegiately with the University of Virginia from 1984 to 1987.  In 1987, he was selected as a first team All American and the ISAA Goalkeeper of the Year.  He graduated with a bachelor's degree in physics then gained a master's degree in aerospace engineering from the University of Texas at Austin.  He returned to UVa to attend the Darden Graduate School of Business Administration and assist as a goalkeeper coach with the Cavaliers.  He joined A.T. Kearney in 1985.  In 1995, he left the company to become a Vice President of EDS.  In 2005, he returned to A.T. Kearney as president of A.T. Kearney Public Sector & Defense Services, LLC and Vice President of A.T. Kearney.

Professional work 

Prior to joining A.T. Kearney, Bob worked at General Dynamics Space Systems,  providing technical support for the Atlas family of space launch vehicles and various commercial business development activities. He joined A.T. Kearney in 1995 as a consultant.  In 2001, after having been promoted to principal,  Willen coauthored the book, Rebuilding the Corporate Genome: Unlocking the Real Value of Your Business  with Johan C. Aurik, current chairman of A.T. Kearney,  and Gillis J Jonk, a former A.T. Kearney partner. In 2008, Willen was named as one of the leaders of A.T. Kearney's Public Sector practice in the Americas.  In 2013, he was also named the leader in the Automotive Practice and Aerospace & Defense Practice. He was appointed managing director for the Middle East in 2015.

References

External links
 A.T. Kearney company bio

All-American men's college soccer players
American businesspeople
American soccer coaches
American soccer players
Association football goalkeepers
Cockrell School of Engineering alumni
University of Virginia Darden School of Business alumni
Virginia Cavaliers men's soccer coaches
Virginia Cavaliers men's soccer players
Living people
People from Shoreham, New York
Year of birth missing (living people)